Gwynllyw Filwr or Gwynllyw Farfog, known in English in a corrupted form as Woolos the Warrior or Woolos the Bearded (450 – 500 AD) was a Welsh king and religious figure.

He was King of Gwynllŵg in South Wales and is the legendary founder and patron saint of the City of Newport living around the 5th century. According to medieval tradition he was a feared warlord and raider who knew King Arthur, but later found religion and became a hermit founding St Woolos Cathedral in Newport. He was the father of one of the most revered Welsh saints, Saint Cadoc the Wise.

Traditional history
The medieval lives of Saint Cadoc (c. 1100) by Lifris and of Saint Gwynllyw (c. 1120) preserve legendary details of Gwynllyw, though details frequently differ. He is also noted in Welsh king lists. The saint's lives note that his deeds were celebrated by Welsh bards, indicating he had a widespread popular following. Although saints' lives frequently exaggerate it does seem likely that a monarch of this name existed and a core element in the lives may contain some true details.

Gwynllyw was the son of King Glywys, whose powerful kingdom of Glywysing was centred on Glamorgan, and it’s debatable as where the end borders were, some accounts say it reached as far east as the River Towy but some historians claim because the Ystrad Tywi was a separate cantref altogether it may have been the River Loughor. He was a descendant of Macsen Wledig according to some accounts, while his mother Guaul was equally distinguished, being the granddaughter of Cunedda. The kingdom was split on Glywys' death amongst his sons, of whom Gwynllyw was the eldest and most powerful, and he was overlord over the others. The central area of his rule consisted of the cantref of Gwynllwg that was named after him and later known in English as Wentloog hundred. One of Gwynllyw's brothers was Saint Petroc, an important Cornish, and Breton saint and patron saint of Devon.

The saints' lives portray King Gwynllyw as an active and merciless warrior who attacked and raided nearby kingdoms. The Life of Saint Cadoc describes him as "very partial to thieves, and used to instigate them somewhat often to robberies" but the Life of Saint Gwynllyw insists he was a just and fair ruler. These raids included attacking his northern neighbour Brycheiniog. In one such raid described in Life of Saint Cadoc Gwynllyw accompanied by 300 men abducted Gwladys (Gladys) the beautiful daughter of King Brychan of Brycheiniog, as Brychan had refused to let him marry her. She was one of Brychan's famous twenty-four children. A pitched battle occurred which was only stopped by the intervention of King Arthur and Cai and Bedwyr who supported Gwynllyw and his war band in the battle. This tale of abduction seems similar to elements in the tale Culhwch and Olwen and other Arthurian stories indicating it originated in bardic stories. This is the earliest reference to Arthur in a Saint's life. According to the Life of Saint Gwynllyw this battle never occurred and the marriage was actually accomplished peacefully.

Gwaldys soon had a son, the famous saint Cadoc. To celebrate his son's birth Gwynllyw went on another raid stealing cattle from Caerwent. When Saint Tatheus came courageously to demand the return of a cow, the King was so impressed he decided in return to send his son to Tathyw at Caerwent to be educated. Gwynllyw supposedly had other children, also saints: Cynidr, Bugi and Egwine. Bugi was married to Peren, daughter of King Lleuddun Llyddog of Lothian. One, Maches (Latin: Machuta), the sister of Cadoc according to tradition, was killed by robbers who were stealing her finest ram. Tathan, to whom the murderers confessed their crime, built a church on the spot.

Once grown, Cadoc was deeply religious and, according to some sources, it was his example and preaching that persuaded Gwynllyw to abandon his life of violence and to seek forgiveness for his sins. King Gwynllyw then had a dream in which an angel spoke to him and he saw a vision of a white ox with a black spot on its high forehead. Gwynllyw went forth and when he saw the same ox as in his dream he founded a hermitage there on what is now Stow Hill in Newport, South Wales which he built out of wood. Gwynllyw said of the spot: "There is no retreat in the world such as in this space which I am destined now to inhabit. Happy therefore is the place, happier then is he who inhabits it."  Gwynllyw's decision to abandon his kingship and retire to a religious life seems to have been a common theme amongst Welsh saints and even his violent past was not unusual, being shared by Saint Illtyd amongst others.

Gwladys accompanied Gwynllyw into a hermit's life, and for a while they lived together on Stow Hill, fasting, eating a vegetarian diet, and bathing in the cold waters of the Usk to prove their piety. A miraculous fountain started on the hill when Gwynllyw prayed for water. Later they moved further apart, Saint Gwladys founding her own hermitage at Pencarn.

When Gwynllyw was dying he was attended both by his son Cadoc and by Saint Dubricius, who administered the last sacrament to him. The traditional date of his death, 29 March, is the day dedicated to him. The year of his death is uncertain; suggestions include 500 and 523. Following his death his hermit cell became an important shrine and a church was built there. This is now St Woolos Cathedral, the seat of the Bishop of Monmouth. In the 9th century Gwynllyw's church was rebuilt in stone, indicating his importance and the wealth of his shrine, as stone buildings were unusual in Wales at that time. Part of this building is now incorporated into St Woolos Cathedral as the Galilee chapel.

Veneration
The cult of the saint according to his life grew as a series of miracles were attributed to him. His fountain healed those who drank from it and angels were seen near his tomb. Later miracles included the protection of a bard from flood waters, and the destruction of a Viking fleet at sea after they plundered the church which was full of rich offerings made to the saint. The defeat of King Harold Godwinson at the Battle of Hastings was attributed to the vengeance of Saint Gwynllyw because he and his troops had plundered Gwynllyw's church recently while attacking the nearby kingdom of Gwent. Gwynllyw also drove a man mad who stole from his church. Descriptions of the attacks on the church do coincide correctly with periods of warfare in the area so they are probably based on fact, whatever the truth of the miracles might be. The saint's cult obviously became deeply revered, not only by the Welsh, but by Saxons and Normans who came to live in the Newport area and the Norman Lords of Newport continued to enlarge the church – a process that has continued up to the present day.

Post-medieval folklore

Stories of Gwynllyw's dark past later included tales of piracy and claims that his ships, based in the Uskside parish of Pillgwenlly that bears his name, caused terror across the Bristol Channel. One tradition asserts that this background meant Gwynllyw was the patron saint of choice for Welsh pirates and smugglers including Sir Henry Morgan. Certainly the many sailors based in Newport would have known of him. Another local story claims that Gwynllyw forcibly baptised the population of Gwynllwg by the sword.

In 1949 St Woolos Church became a full cathedral and, besides churches, the saint is remembered today through St Woolos Hospital, St Woolos Primary School and in 1988 a Welsh language school, Ysgol Gyfun Gwynllyw, was set up in Pontypool. The vision of an ox inspired the sculpture by Sebastien Boyesen called The Vision of Saint Gwynllyw or The Bell Carrier, finished in 1996 and found in central Newport today.

See also
 Saint Gwynllyw, patron saint archive

Notes

External links

St Woolos Cathedral
Gwynllyw on National Library of Wales Dictionary of Welsh Biography

450s births
6th-century deaths
Arthurian characters
Ascetics
Angelic visionaries
Monarchs of Morgannwg
People from Newport, Wales
Medieval Welsh saints
6th-century Christian saints
6th-century rulers in Europe
Monarchs of Glywysing
Christian royal saints